Gustav Adolf of Sweden - English (and Latin) also: Gustavus Adolphus ; Swedish: Gustav Adolf and (legal spelling after 1900): Gustaf Adolf - may refer to:
Gustavus Adolphus (Gustav II Adolf, 1594-1632), King of Sweden 1611-1632
Gustav IV Adolf of Sweden (Gustav IV Adolf, 1778-1837), King of Sweden 1792-1809
Gustaf VI Adolf of Sweden (Gustaf VI Adolf, 1882-1973), King of Sweden 1950-1973
Gustav Adolf, Prince of Sweden de facto 1652, son of Prince Adolph John I, Count Palatine of Kleeburg (died in infancy)
Prince Gustaf Adolf, Duke of Västerbotten (1906-1947), Prince of Sweden